Wickr is an American software company based in New York City. The company is best known for its instant messenger application of the same name. The Wickr instant messaging apps allow users to exchange end-to-end encrypted and content-expiring messages, including photos, videos, and file attachments. The software is available for the iOS, Android, Mac, Windows, and Linux operating systems. On June 25, 2021, Wickr was acquired by Amazon Web Services.

History 
Wickr was founded in 2012 by a group of security experts and privacy advocates. Nico Sell served as the company's CEO until May 2015 when she became the co-chairman of Wickr and CEO of Wickr Foundation, the newly launched nonprofit whose seed funding was provided by the company. Mark Fields, who previously led CME's Strategic Investment Group, became the company's CEO. He served in that position until November 2016, when he was replaced by Joel Wallenstrom, co-founder of iSec Partners, becoming the company's CEO and President.

Apps 
Since developing its first app, Wickr Me, the company has released Wickr Pro, Wickr RAM, and Wickr Enterprise. Wickr RAM was designed with the military in mind; the app stays secure even in "harshest environments". While Wickr Enterprise was created for companies with larger workforces to easily integrate into their organization's IT workflows.

All communications on Wickr are encrypted locally on each device with a new key generated for each new message, meaning that no one except Wickr users has the keys to decipher their content.  In addition to encrypting user data and conversations, Wickr strips metadata from all content transmitted through the network.

Since its launch, Wickr has gone through regular security audits by prominent information security organizations, which have verified Wickr's code, security, and policies. Wickr has also launched a bug bounty program that offers a reward to hackers who can find a vulnerability in the app.

On January 5, 2015, the Electronic Frontier Foundation gave Wickr a score of 5 out of 7 points on their "Secure Messaging Scorecard". It received points for having communications encrypted in transit, having communications encrypted with keys the provider didn't have access to (end-to-end encryption), making it possible for users to independently verify their correspondent's identities, having past communications secure if the keys were stolen (forward secrecy), and having completed a recent independent security audit. It was missing points because its source code was not open to independent review (open source), and because its security design was not well-documented. In 2015, Wickr published a white paper outlining the encryption protocol that they use for end-to-end encryption.

In 2015, the Electronic Frontier Foundation announced that Wickr, among only nine companies, earned stars in every applicable category for its effort to protect user privacy: "We commend Wickr for its strong stance regarding user rights, transparency, and privacy."

In December 2016, Wickr announced Wickr Professional, a new business collaboration and communication product designed to couple the functionality of tools like Slack with end-to-end encryption and ephemerality.

In February 2017, Wickr opened one of its crypto protocols for public review on GitHub and published a paper “The Wickr Messaging Protocol” as an aid to those who wish to review the source code. At the time of its publication, the crypto protocol was only used in the company's enterprise product, Wickr Professional. The company said that its consumer product, Wickr Messenger, still uses another protocol and that they intend to replace this protocol with the one that they published.

In early 2020, Wickr RAM was included in a review by the NSA of secure communication and collaboration platforms. Wickr RAM was the only app that was found to meet every single criterion that was assessed.

According to The Washington Post, Wickr markets itself to government agencies. Government transparency advocates note that Maryland Governor Larry Hogan's use of Wickr destroys government records before any determination of whether they should be public can be made, under the Freedom of Information Act and state law.

Wickr announced that it would be focusing on its business and public sector versions, AWS Wickr and Wickr Enterprise, instead.

Wickr Me

Initially unveiled on iOS and later on Android, the Wickr Me app allows users to set an expiration time for their encrypted communications. In December 2014, Wickr released a desktop version of its secure communications platform. The release of the desktop Wickr app coincided with introducing the ability to sync messages across multiple devices, including mobile phones, tablets, and computers.

On 18 November 2022, Wickr announced that it will be ending the free Wickr Me version of its app by the end of 2023. Wickr Me will not be accepting new user registrations after 31 December 2022, and will stop the Wickr Me services completely per 31 December 2023.

Funding 
In March 2014, Wickr announced its Series A funding round of $9 million led by Gilman Louie of Alsop Louie Partners. The series also included investments from Juniper Networks and the Knight Foundation.

In June 2014, Wickr announced its Series B funding round of $30 million led by Breyer Capital, including CME Group and Wargaming.

On 12 October 2021, a Vice Motherboard article revealed that the Central Intelligence Agency (CIA) had invested $1.6 million into Wickr via the CIA's shell company In-Q-Tel.

Gilman Louie is the former CEO of In-Q-Tel, and other investors, including Richard Clarke and Michael Wertheimer, also have close ties to the U.S. intelligence and national security communities. It is also known that Erik Prince, the founder of the controversial private security firm Blackwater, is one of the principal investors.

Wickr Foundation
The Wickr Foundation is a non-profit founded by Wickr founder Nico Sell.

The foundation operates a social-impact venture fund with a global mission to advance the Private Web and transform how society uses the Internet. In addition to educating the public on privacy and information security, Wickr Foundation is focused on incubating and investing in ideas that revolutionize user control and empower data ownership.

The foundation is dedicated to providing information security and privacy training to human rights activists, policy-makers, children, and journalists, and leads several initiatives to raise global awareness of privacy and encourage the development of security-enhancing technologies.

See also

 Comparison of instant messaging clients
 Internet privacy
 Secure instant messaging

References

External links
 

2021 mergers and acquisitions
Amazon (company) acquisitions
Companies based in San Francisco
Companies established in 2012
Instant messaging clients
Privately held companies based in California